The Magdalena Caldense District is  a subregion of the Colombian Department of Caldas.

La Dorada (Capital)
Norcasia
Samana
Victoria

References 

Subregions of Caldas Department